The 2022–23 Towson Tigers men's basketball team represents Towson University in the 2022–23 NCAA Division I men's basketball season. The Tigers, led by 12th-year head coach Pat Skerry, play their home games at the SECU Arena in Towson, Maryland as members of the Colonial Athletic Association.

Previous season
The Tigers finished the 2021–22 season 25–9, 15–3 in CAA play to finish as CAA regular season co-champions, alongside UNC Wilmington. As the top seed in the CAA tournament, they defeated Northeastern in the quarterfinals, before being upset by No. 5 seed and eventual tournament champions Delaware in the semifinals. As a regular season conference champion who failed to win their conference tournament title, the Tigers earned an automatic bid to the NIT, where they lost in the first round to Wake Forest.

Roster

Schedule and results

|-
!colspan=12 style=| Exhibition

|-
!colspan=12 style=| Non-conference regular season

|-
!colspan=12 style=| CAA regular season

|-
!colspan=9 style=| CAA tournament

Sources

References

Towson Tigers men's basketball seasons
Towson
Towson
Towson